The D-Generation was a popular and influential Australian TV sketch comedy show, produced and broadcast by the Australian Broadcasting Corporation (ABC) for two series, between 1986 and 1987. A further four specials were broadcast on the Seven Network between 1988 and 1989. The show would also serve as a stepping stone for many early incarnations of iconic characters, including Lynne Postlethwaite, Gina Hard-Faced B***h, Eileen Maverick and Kelvin Cunnington.

Synopsis 
The series was produced and directed by Kris Noble and was created and written by a group of Melbourne University students who had gained local notoriety for their stage work: Rob Sitch, Santo Cilauro, Marg Downey, Michael Veitch, Magda Szubanski, John Harrison, and Tom Gleisner. Also part of the original team was Nick Bufalo, who appeared in the unscreened one-hour D-Generation pilot (1985), before accepting a long-running role on TV soap A Country Practice. Several of Bufalo's sketches from the pilot (including the famous Thunderbirds parody) were incorporated into series one, and Bufalo himself returned for the specials. Actress/comedian Jane Turner and New Zealander Tony Martin joined from series two, and Melbourne Uni Revue stars Mick Molloy and Jason Stephens were added for the specials.

 Nick Bufalo (1985, 1988–89)
 John Harrison (1985–89)
 Magda Szubanski (1985–89)
 Marg Downey (1985–89)
 Michael Veitch (1985–89)
 Rob Sitch (1985–93)
 Santo Cilauro (1985–93)
 Tom Gleisner (1985–93)
 Sue Yardley (1987–88)
 Jane Turner (1987–89)
 Tony Martin (1987–93)
 Jane Kennedy (1988–93)
 Jason Stephens (1988–93)
 Mick Molloy (1988–93)
 Judith Lucy (1991–93)

Episodes

Series one (1986)

Series two (1987)

Highlights series

Channel 7 specials

Video and DVD releases

Two "best of" videos were released: The Best of the Original D-Generation was released on ABC-video in 1996 and featured selected highlights from the two ABC series.
A second video was released in 1997 called Degenocide: The Second Best of the Original D-Generation which featured additional material from the ABC series along with highlights from the Channel 7 specials including the highly popular Homicide spoofs. The latter video also featured bonus material including footage filmed on Super 8 by the group whilst at University, clips from the Channel-9 pilots, both of the Five-in-a-Row music videos, home-video footage of their 1991 stage show at Le Joke and clips from when the D-Generation were guest hosts on Countdown and Burke's Backyard.

In 2004, both of the above videos were re-released on a single DVD The Best and Second Best of the D-Generation.

Radio serial
The D Generation breakfast show was a hugely successful radio program which ran for six years (19 May 1986-April 1992) on Melbourne's Triple M (originally EON FM). Highlights of the show were released on albums.

Discography

Studio albums

Singles

Awards

ARIA Music Awards
The ARIA Music Awards is an annual awards ceremony that recognises excellence, innovation, and achievement across all genres of Australian music. The D-Generation won one awards from two nominations.

|-
|  1990
| The Satanic Sketches
| rowspan="2"| ARIA Award for Best Comedy Release
| 
|-
|  1991
| The Breakfast Tapes (1988-90)
| 
|-

Breakfast show lineup
Rob Sitch. (19 May 1986 / Jan. 1989-Dec. 1991)
Tom Gleisner. (19 May 1986-April 1992)
Santo Cilauro. (19 May 1986-April 1992)
Tony Martin. (June 1987-December 1991)
Michael Veitch. (October 1987-April 1989)
Marg Downey. (June 1988–April 1989)
Magda Szubanski. (June 1988–April 1989)
Jane Kennedy. (June 1988-April 1992)
Mick Molloy. (January 1990-April 1992)
Jason Stephens. (January 1990-April 1992)
Judith Lucy. (April 1991-April 1992)
John Harrison (September–December 1991)

Post D-Generation
Cast members of both the television and radio show (Sitch, Gleisner, Martin, Cilauro, Molloy, Stephens and Jane Kennedy) subsequently moved on to the equally popular ABC TV series The Late Show which ran for two years (1992–1993) with stand-up comic Judith Lucy joining the cast for the second series.

Four D-Generation cast members (Veitch, Downey, Szubanski and Turner) went on to a similarly-styled and very popular
sketch comedy series, Fast Forward (1989–1992) on Channel 7. All later made guest appearances on this show's sequel, Full Frontal (1993–1997), which marked the TV debut of actor and comic Eric Bana.

Fast Forward itself led to the Channel 7 comedy shows, Big Girl's Blouse (1994), starring Magda Szubanski, Jane Turner and Gina Riley, and Something Stupid (1998), with the same trio plus Marg Downey. Both series featured the parodic Aussie suburban characters who were later the 'stars' of the hit series Kath & Kim (2002-2007).

Szubanski, Riley, Turner, Downey and Veitch would reunite once more as part of the cast of sketch comedy series Open Slather (2015) on Foxtel's The Comedy Channel.

Rob, Santo and Tom
Three of the original D-Generation cast – Rob Sitch, Santo Cilauro and Tom Gleisner, along with Jane Kennedy and long time D-Gen producer Michael Hirsh are the principals of the successful Australian production company Working Dog Productions.

TV:
Frontline (1994–1997)
Funky Squad (1995)
The Campaign (1996) (Documentary)
A River Somewhere (1997–1998)
The Panel (1998–2004)
All Aussie Adventures (2001–2004)
Thank God You're Here (2006–2009)
The Hollowmen (2008)
Utopia (2014-)

Radio serials:
Funky Squad (1994)
Medico Point (1995)
Implausible Rescue (1996)
Johnny Swank (1996)

Film:
The Castle (1997)
The Dish (2000)
Any Questions for Ben? (2012)

Books:
Molvanîa: A Land Untouched by Modern Dentistry (2003)
Phaic Tăn: Sunstroke on a Shoestring (2004)
San Sombrèro: A Land of Carnivals, Cocktails and Coups (2006)

Tony and Mick
Tony Martin and Mick Molloy have remained an on-again/off-again team producing many film, radio and television features.
Their most well known project 'Martin/Molloy', had a run of four years and released three ARIA Award-winning compilation albums – The Brown Album (1995), Poop Chute (1996) and Eat Your Peas (1998).

In mid-2007, the duo had a highly publicised falling out following a dispute over the production of the DVD for the film Boytown and have not worked together since.

TV:
The Mick Molloy Show (1999)
Any Given Sunday (2006) (Molloy)
The Nation (2007) (Molloy)
Before the Game (2007-2013) (Molloy)
The Jesters (2009, 2011) (Molloy)
A Quiet Word With.... (2010-2011) (Martin)
The Joy of Sets (2011) (Martin)

Radio:
Bulltwang (Sept.-Dec. 1991)
Martin/Molloy (1995–1998)
Tough Love (with Mick Molloy) (2004–2006)
Get This (with Tony Martin) (2006–2007)
The Lonely Hearts Club (with Tony Martin) (Feb-April 2011)
The Hot Breakfast (with Mick Molloy) (2011-2017)

Film:
Tackle Happy (2000)
Crackerjack (2002)
Bad Eggs (2003)
BoyTown (2006)

Books:
Lolly Scramble (by Tony Martin) (2005)
A Nest of Occasionals (by Tony Martin) (2009)
Scarcely Relevant (by Tony Martin) (ebook-2012)
Deadly Kerfuffle (by Tony Martin) (2017)

Other cast members
Michael Veitch and Marg Downey returned to sketch comedy in Let Loose Live (2005) but the show was axed after only two episodes due to poor ratings.

Veitch starred in the short-lived Ch-7 period sitcom Bligh (1992) and was a cast-regular in the TV-1 comedy series Shock Jock (2001-2002) and more recently on the Comedy Channel's Open Slather (2015). He also served as the host of ABC-TV's Sunday Arts, worked as an announcer on ABC radio, has authored six books (four of them on Second World War aviation) and has made successful forays into theatre including starring as Molly Meldrum in the Countdown tribute musical I Can't Believe its not Countdown.

Downey has appeared in a number of film and TV productions, in both comedic and dramatic roles, including the 1994 TV movie Economy Class, the 2000 sitcom Sit Down, Shut Up, a recurring role in Kath & Kim and appearances in the 2006 US series Nightmares & Dreamscapes and the 2012 movie Kath & Kimderella.

Nick Bufalo has gone on to be a successful TV director who has made several videos and specials with Australian children's band The Wiggles.

Jason Stephens is now the Director of Development for Fremantlemedia Australia, one of Australia's leading independent television production companies.  He produced The King, the AFI Award-winning telemovie based on the life of Graham Kennedy, and is the executive producer of Newstopia (2007–08) with Shaun Micallef. Stephens was also the creator of The Choir of Hard Knocks.

John Harrison left the group at the end of 1991 and virtually 'retired' from comedy, embarking on a successful career in the corporate sector. However, he made several guest appearances on The Late Show (1992-1993) and had a brief cameo as a newsreader on Tony Martin's 2003 film Bad Eggs.

Judith Lucy has had a successful career in stand-up comedy and has also worked in radio, appeared in the films Crackerjack and Bad Eggs and starred in two ABC-TV series Judith Lucy's Spiritual Journey and Judith Lucy is All Woman.

References

External links
 
 
The D-Generation at the National Film and Sound Archive
The D-Generation - Episode 1 at Australian Screen Online

ARIA Award winners
Australian comedy television series
Australian Broadcasting Corporation original programming
1986 Australian television series debuts
1989 Australian television series endings
Australian comedy troupes
Australian television sketch shows